Henri Willem Petri (5 April 1856 – 7 April 1914) was a Dutch violinist, music pedagogue, composer and arranger who spent his entire career in Germany.

Life 
Born in Zeist, Petri came from a musical family. His father was oboist in the city orchestra of Utrecht; his cousin  (1865-1950) was an organist, pianist and music pedagogue, and another cousin, Martinus Petri (1853-1924) was also a violinist and conductor. From 1871 to 1874, he studied with Joseph Joachim at the Hochschule für Musik in Berlin and was singled out as one of his favorite pupils. Petri was one of the soloists at the celebrations for Joachim's 50th and 60th anniversaries as a performer in 1889 and 1899.
In 1877, Petri performed Spohr's "Gesangscene" Violin Concerto in a minor at the Crystal Palace concerts in London. Subsequently, he was a regular soloist  with the Gewandhaus Orchestra, the Berlin Philharmonic, and other regional orchestras. From 1877 to 1881, he was concertmaster at the Fürstliche Hofkapelle Sondershausen and from 1881 to 1882 in Hanover. In October 1882 he became concertmaster of the famous Gewandhausorchester in Leipzig. He remained in this position until 1889; he then became Royal Saxon concertmaster (Königliche Sächsischer Konzertmeister) at the Dresdner Hofkapelle, (present-day Staatskapelle Dresden) . He held this position for twenty-five years, until his death from pneumonia in 1914.

In addition to being concertmaster, he took over after the death of Eduard Rappoldi in 1903 as Professor of Music and head of the strings department at the Dresden Conservatory (today the Hochschule für Musik Carl Maria von Weber Dresden). Among his students were the conductor Willem Mengelberg, the composers Gustav Carl Luders, Dora Pejačević, Arno Starck, and the violinists Franz Spiess and Alberto Bachmann.

Petri led various chamber music ensembles. Together with Bolland, Thümer and Klengel (later A. Schröder) he made up the Gewandhaus Quartet during his Leipzig years. In Dresden, he founded his own Petri Quartet together with Erdmann Warwas (violin), Alfred Spitzner (viola) and Georg Wille (cello). Their concert series in Dresden lasted until 1914. There is a portrait of the string quartet painted in 1907 by Robert Sterl.

Petri made a large number of arrangements and editions for the violin. While in Leipzig Petri became friends with the composer Ferruccio Busoni. Busoni dedicated his second String Quartet Op. 26 to Petri, as well as the Violin Concerto Op. 35a, whose premiere he gave in 1897 with the Berlin Philharmonic, conducted by Busoni himself.

His son Egon Petri (1881-1962) was an important pianist who studied with Busoni.

Compositions

Vocal music

Songs 
 1884 Sechs Lieder, for voice and piano, op. 4
 Die Waise "Sie haben mich geheissen"  - text: Adelbert von Chamisso
 Volkslied: "Hat dich ein blühendes Blümchen" - text: A. Träger
 Trost "Glücklich wer auf Gott vertraut" -  text: August Heinrich Hoffmann von Fallersleben
 Neig' schöne Knospe - text: Mirzə Şəfi Vazeh
 Die Ablösung "In Schnee und Eis in kalter Nacht" - text: Robert Reinick
 Die Quelle "Uns're Quelle kommt in Schatten" - text: Adelbert von Chamisso
 1884 Lieder - Lieder aus Williram, for voice and piano, op. 5 - text: E. Kühne
 Lied der Berthradis "Schlafe nur ein, mein Kind" 
 Die Engel droben sind rein und schön
 Die Blume senkt das Köpfchen
 Ging ein munt'rer Vogelsteller
 Gute Nacht: "Im tiefsten Innern"
 Lieder, for voice and piano, op. 6
 Vergissmeinnicht: "Wild bewachs'ne Felsen" - text: A. von Tettau
 Tobe! tobe mein Herz - text: A. von Tettau
 Du bist so still, so sanft, so innig - text: Emmanuel Geibel
 Wie des Mondes Abbild zittert - text: Heinrich Heine
 Das Rosenband: "Im Frühlingsschatten" - text: Friedrich Gottlieb Klopstock
 Wiegenlied: Guten Abend, gute Nacht (after Johannes Brahms)

Chamber music 
 1884: Sechs kleine Stücke, for violin and piano, op. 1
 1884: Albumblatt und Barcarole, for violin and piano, op. 2
 1884: Drei Fantasiestücke, for violin and piano, op. 3
 1900: Die hohe Schule des Violinspiels - Werke berühmter Meister des 17. u. 18. Jahrhunderts Bd. I, Nr. 1-7., for violin and piano
 1910: Die hohe Schule des Violinspiels nr. 1, (Nr. 1-10), for violin and piano
 1910: Die hohe Schule des Violinspiels nr. 2, (Nr. 11 - 20), for violin and piano
 18 kleine Duette, for 2 violins
 Träumerei, for violin and piano - dedicated to Pauline Erdmannsdörfer-Eichtner

Work for violin 
 1885: Künstler-Etüden, for violin solo, op. 9

Further reading 
 Gemälde, Zeichnungen, Briefe und Dokumente - Sonderausstellung zum 90. Todestag des Dirigenten Ernst von Schuch (1846–1914) und des Soloviolinisten Henri Petri (1856–1914), in Katalog der Ausstellung vom 1. Mai bis 18. Juli 2004 in Robert-Sterl-Haus Naundorf (Sachsen). 
 Ferruccio Busoni: Briefe an Henri, Katharina und Egon Petri : Gesamtausgabe. Wilhelmshaven Noetzel, 1999.
 Wilhelm Joseph von Wasielewski en Waldemar von Wasielewski: Die Violine und ihre Meister, 4th edition, Sändig, Wiesbaden 1904, .

References

External links 
 
 Portret van Henri Petri

Dutch male classical composers
Dutch classical composers
Dutch music educators
Dutch classical violinists
Dutch music arrangers
Concertmasters
1856 births
1914 deaths
People from Zeist